Jana Švandová (born 3 July 1947) is a Czech actress. She has appeared in more than 65 films and television shows since 1969.

Selected filmography
 Svět otevřený náhodám (1971)
 Lovers in the Year One (1973)
 The Garden (1995)
 2Bobule (2009)

References

External links

1947 births
Living people
Czech film actresses
Czech television actresses
Czech stage actresses
Actresses from Prague
20th-century Czech actresses
21st-century Czech actresses